OTO Award TV Host – Entertainment

First awarded  | Last awarded 2000 | 2013  

OTO Award for TV Host – Entertainment was awarded from the first until the 14th edition of the accolades, held in 2013. Each year, the award was presented to the most recognized television hosts in entertainers of the past year with the ceremony permitted live by the national television network STV.

Winners and nominees

2000s

2010s

Superlatives

Notes
┼ Denotes also a winner in two or more of the main categories. † Denotes also a winner of the Absolute OTO category.

References

External links
 OTO Awards (Official website)
 OTO Awards - Winners and nominees (From 2000 onwards)
 OTO Awards - Winners and nominees (From 2000 to 2009)

Host - Entertainment
Slovak culture
Slovak television awards
Awards established in 2000